Malus prunifolia is a species of crabapple  tree known by the common names plumleaf crab apple, plum-leaved apple, pear-leaf crabapple, Chinese apple and Chinese crabapple. It is native to China, and is grown elsewhere for use as an ornamental tree or as rootstock. It reaches from between 3 and 8 meters tall and bears white flowers and yellow or red fruit.

It was described botanically by Willd. in the genus Pyrus, and transferred to Malus in 1803 to produce the nomenclatural treatment used here.

Range and habitat 
Malus prunifolia is found in China in the provinces of Gansu, Guizhou, Hebei, Henan, Liaoning, Nei Mongol, Qinghai, Shaanxi, Shandong, Shanxi, and possibly Xinjiang. It is adapted to grow at a variety elevations from sea-level plains, to slopes as high as 1300 meters.

Varieties 
Malus prunifolia has at least four varieties, some are grown for their fruit:

Malus prunifolia var. obliquipedicellata  X.W. Li & J.W. Sun M. prunifolia var. prunifolia M. prunifolia var. ringo  Asami (Chinese apple) M. prunifolia var. rinki  (Koidz.) Rehder P.L.Wilson (plum-leaf or Chinese crabapple)

References

External links

prunifolia
Crabapples
Endemic flora of China
Garden plants of Asia
Ornamental trees
Plants described in 1803
Fruit trees